Valmont is an unincorporated community and a census-designated place (CDP) located in and governed by Boulder County, Colorado, United States. The CDP is a part of the Boulder, CO Metropolitan Statistical Area. The population of the Valmont CDP was 59 at the United States Census 2010. The Boulder post office (Zip Code 80301) serves the area.

History
Valmont was platted in 1865, and named for the valleys and peaks near the town site. A post office called Valmont was established in 1865, and remained in operation until 1901.

Geography
Valmont is located in southeastern Boulder County, east of the city of Boulder, between Boulder Creek to the north and  Valmont Butte to the south. Valmont Road runs through the center of the community.

Demographics

See also

Outline of Colorado
Index of Colorado-related articles
State of Colorado
Colorado cities and towns
Colorado census designated places
Colorado counties
Boulder County, Colorado
Colorado metropolitan areas
Front Range Urban Corridor
North Central Colorado Urban Area
Denver-Aurora-Boulder, CO Combined Statistical Area
Boulder, CO Metropolitan Statistical Area

References

External links

Boulder County website

Census-designated places in Boulder County, Colorado
Census-designated places in Colorado
Denver metropolitan area
1865 establishments in Colorado Territory